Çamurlu is a village in the Eyyübiye district of Şanlıurfa Province, Turkey. As of the 1990 census, it had a population of 29. The village is the site of Çamurlu Tepe, an archaeological mound measuring 160 m in diameter and 14 m in height. An archaeological survey conducted by N. Yardımcı found remains at Çamurlu Tepe dating from the Halaf and Ubaid periods of the Chalcolithic era, the early Bronze Age, and the Roman and Byzantine periods.

References 

Villages in Şanlıurfa Province